The Committee on Space Research (COSPAR) was established on October 3, 1958 by the International Council for Scientific Unions (ICSU).    Among COSPAR's objectives are the promotion of scientific research in space on an international level, with emphasis on the free exchange of results, information, and opinions, and providing a forum, open to all scientists, for the discussion of problems that may affect space research.  These objectives are achieved through the organization of symposia, publication, and other means.
COSPAR has created a number of research programmes on different topics, a few in cooperation with other scientific Unions. The long-term project COSPAR international reference atmosphere started in 1960; since then it has produced several editions of the high-atmosphere code CIRA. The code "IRI" of the URSI-COSPAR working group on the International Reference Ionosphere was first edited in 1978 and is yearly updated.

General Assembly 
Every second year, COSPAR calls for a General Assembly (also called Scientific Assembly). These are conferences currently gathering almost three thousand participating space researchers. The most recent assemblies are listed in the table below. The 41st General Assembly in Istanbul was cancelled due to the 2016 Turkish coup d'état attempt.

Scientific Structure

Scientific Commissions 

 Scientific Commission A Space Studies of the Earth's Surface, Meteorology and Climate

 Task Group on GEO
 Subcommission A1 on Atmosphere, Meteorology and Climate
 Subcommission A2 on Ocean Dynamics, Productivity and the Cryosphere
 Subcommission A3 on Land Processes and Morphology

 Scientific Commission B Space Studies of the Earth-Moon System, Planets, and Small Bodies of the Solar System

 Sub-Commission B1 on Small Bodies 
 Sub-Commission B2 on International Coordination of Space Techniques for Geodesy (a joint Sub-Commission with IUGG/IAG Commission I on Reference Frames)
 Sub-Commission B3 on The Moon
 Sub-Commission B4 on Terrestrial Planets
 Sub-Commission B5 on Outer Planets and Satellites
 Sub-Commission B6/E4 on Exoplanets Detection, Characterization and Modelling

 Scientific Commission C Space Studies of the Upper Atmospheres of the Earth and Planets Including Reference Atmospheres

 Sub-Commission C1 on The Earth's Upper Atmosphere and Ionosphere
 Sub-Commission C2 on The Earth's Middle Atmosphere and Lower Ionosphere
 Sub-Commission C3 on Planetary Atmospheres and Aeronomy
 Task Group on Reference Atmospheres of Planets and Satellites (RAPS)  
 URSI/COSPAR Task Group on the International Reference Ionosphere (IRI)
 COSPAR/URSI Task Group on Reference Atmospheres, including ISO WG4 (CIRA)
 Sub-Commission C5/D4 on Theory and Observations of Active Experiments

 Scientific Commission D Space Plasmas in the Solar System, Including Planetary Magnetospheres

 Sub-Commission D1 on The Heliosphere
 Sub-Commission D2/E3 on The Transition from the Sun to the Heliosphere
 Sub-Commission D3 on Magnetospheres
 Sub-Commission C5/D4 on Theory and Observations of Active Experiments

 Scientific Commission E Research in Astrophysics from Space

 Sub-Commission E1 on Galactic and Extragalactic Astrophysics
 Sub-Commission E2 on The Sun as a Star
 Sub-Commission D2/E3 on The Transition from the Sun to the Heliosphere
 Sub-Commission B6/E4 on Exoplanets Detection, Characterization and Modelling

 Scientific Commission F Life Sciences as Related to Space

 Sub-Commission F1 on Gravitational and Space Biology
 Sub-Commission F2 on Radiation Environment, Biology and Health
 Sub-Commission F3 on Astrobiology
 Sub-Commission F4 on Natural and Artificial Ecosystems
 Sub-Commission F5 on Gravitational Physiology in Space

 Scientific Commission G Materials Sciences in Space

 Scientific Commission H Fundamental Physics in Space

Panels            

 Technical Panel on Satellite Dynamics (PSD)
 Panel on Technical Problems Related to Scientific Ballooning (PSB)
 Panel on Potentially Environmentally Detrimental Activities in Space (PEDAS)     
 Panel on Radiation Belt Environment Modelling (PRBEM)
 Panel on Space Weather (PSW)
 Panel on Planetary Protection (PPP)
 Panel on Capacity Building (PCB)
 Panel on Capacity Building Fellowship Program and Alumni (PCB FP)
 Panel on Education (PE)
 Panel on Exploration (PEX)
 Panel on Interstellar Research (PIR)
 Task Group on Establishing an international Constellation of Small Satellites (TGCSS)
 Sub-Group on Radiation Belts (TGCSS-SGRB)
 Panel on Social Sciences and Humanities (PSSH)
 Panel on Innovative Solutions (PoIS)
 Task Group on Establishing an International Geospace Systems Program (TGIGSP)

Planetary Protection Policy
Responding to concerns raised in the scientific community that spaceflight missions to the Moon and other celestial bodies might compromise their future scientific exploration, in 1958 the International Council of Scientific Unions (ICSU) established an ad-hoc Committee on Contamination by Extraterrestrial Exploration (CETEX) to provide advice on these issues. In the next year, this mandate was transferred to the newly founded Committee on Space Research (COSPAR), which as an interdisciplinary scientific committee of the ICSU (now the International Science Council - ISC) was considered to be the appropriate place to continue the work of CETEX. Since that time, COSPAR has provided an international forum to discuss such matters under the terms “planetary quarantine” and later “planetary protection”, and has formulated a COSPAR planetary protection policy with associated implementation requirements as an international standard to protect against interplanetary biological and organic contamination, and after 1967 as a guide to compliance with Article IX of the United Nations Outer Space Treaty in that area.

The COSPAR Planetary Protection Policy, and its associated requirements, is not legally binding under international law, but it is an internationally agreed standard with implementation guidelines for compliance with Article IX of the Outer Space Treaty.  States Parties to the Outer Space Treaty are responsible for national space activities under Article VI of this Treaty, including the activities of governmental and non-governmental entities. It is the State that ultimately will be held responsible for wrongful acts committed by its jurisdictional subjects.

Updating the COSPAR Planetary Protection Policy, either as a response to new discoveries or based on specific requests, is a process that involves appointed members of the COSPAR Panel on Planetary Protection who represent, on the one hand, their national or international authority responsible for compliance with the United Nations Outer Space Treaty of 1967, and, on the other hand, COSPAR Scientific Commissions B – Space Studies of the Earth-Moon System, Planets and Small Bodies of the Solar Systems, and F - Life Sciences as Related to Space. After reaching a consensus among the involved parties, the proposed recommendation for updating the Policy is formulated by the COSPAR Panel on Planetary Protection and submitted to the COSPAR Bureau for review and approval.

The new structure of the Panel and its work was described in recent publications.

The recently updated COSPAR Policy on Planetary Protection was published in the August 2020 issue of COSPAR's journal Space Research Today. It contains some updates with respect to the previously approved version  based on recommendations formulated by the Panel and approved by the COSPAR Bureau.

See also 
 Space research
 Planetary protection, for other bodies and Earth
 International Planetary Data Alliance
 List of government space agencies

References

External links 

Scientific organizations based in France
Astronomy organizations
Space research
International organizations based in France
International scientific organizations